The People's Federal Republic of Yugoslavia enforced the collectivization of its agricultural sector between 1946 and 1952. The policy, as per directions issued in February 1946, aimed to consolidate individual landholdings and labour into collective farms (Peasants' Work Cooperatives). The Yugoslav government followed the pattern of the Soviet Union, with two types of farms, the state farms and collective farms. The peasants' holdings were operated under government supervision, the state farms owned by the governments were operated by hired labour. Of the European communist states, Yugoslavia ranked second, behind Bulgaria, in proportion of peasant households in collectives. In 1950, 21.9% of arable land and 18.1% of households were under collectivization. The Cazin rebellion of May 1950 was a peasant revolt against the state's collectivization efforts and was a factor in the abandonment of collectivization that occurred throughout the 1950s in Yugoslavia.

See also
Collectivization in the Soviet Union
Economy of the Socialist Federal Republic of Yugoslavia

References

Sources

Socialist Federal Republic of Yugoslavia
Agriculture in Yugoslavia
Agricultural cooperatives
Agricultural labor
Politics of Yugoslavia
Collective farming
1940s in Yugoslavia
1950s in Yugoslavia